Sylvester "The Master Blaster" Mittee (born 29 October 1956) is a Saint Lucian-British boxer of the 1970s and 1980s. He fought as an amateur lightweight and a professional light welterweight/welterweight/light middleweight, winning multiple championships.

Boxing career
As an amateur, Mittee won the 1973 Amateur Boxing Association of England (ABAE) Junior Class-B title, while boxing for Crown and Manor ABC, Hoxton, London. He subsequently won the 1976 ABAE lightweight title against Thomas McCallum (Sparta BC) while boxing for Repton Amateur Boxing Club, Bethnal Green, London.

Mittee represented Great Britain at the 1976 Summer Olympics in Montreal, Quebec, Canada, competing as a lightweight in the boxing events. After a bye in the round of 64, his sole fight was a loss to Simion Cuţov of Romania, the eventual silver medalist, in the round of 32; the referee stopped the contest in the third round.

As a professional, Mittee won the British Boxing Board of Control (BBBofC) Southern (England) Area light welterweight title, the BBBofC British welterweight title and Commonwealth welterweight title, and was a challenger for the BBBofC British light welterweight title against Clinton McKenzie, and European Boxing Union (EBU) welterweight title against Lloyd Honeyghan.

References

External links
Sylvester Mittee at boxrec.com

1956 births
Boxers at the 1976 Summer Olympics
Boxers from Greater London
British male boxers
Light-middleweight boxers
Lightweight boxers
Light-welterweight boxers
Living people
Olympic boxers of Great Britain
Place of birth missing (living people)
Saint Lucian emigrants to the United Kingdom
Welterweight boxers